This is a list of the top 100 Major League Baseball (MLB) starting pitchers in career Jaffe Wins Above Replacement Score (JAWS). JAWS is a sabermetric stat developed by statistician Jay Jaffe to determine a player's rank at their position in relation to worthiness for election into the National Baseball Hall of Fame. 

Walter Johnson is the all-time leader for starting pitchers with a value of 127 JAWS. The active leaders are Justin Verlander and Clayton Kershaw with a value of 61.3 JAWS.

Key

List
 Stats updated as of the completion of the 2021 season

See also

Jaffe Wins Above Replacement Score

Notes

Sources

Jaffe Wins Above Replacement Score